Louis-Hector de Callière or Callières (12 November 1648 – 26 May 1703) was a French military officer, who was the governor of Montreal (1684–1699), and the 13th governor of New France from 1698 to 1703. During his tenure as governor of Montreal, the Iroquois war had enhanced the importance of that position. He conducted himself so well during this period that he was awarded the prestigious cross of Saint-Louis in 1694 partly under the recommendation of Buade de Frontenac. He, additionally, played an important role in defining the strategy that New France followed during Queen Anne's War. He ranked as captain in the regiment of Navarre. He came to Canada in 1684, and was appointed Governor of Montreal at the request of the Sulpicians who were Seigneurs of the island. The situation of the colony at that time was most critical, owing to Frontenac's departure, the weakness of Governor de la Barre, and the woeful error of the French government in sending  some Iroquois chiefs captured at Cataracoui (Kingston) to be galley slaves in France.

In 1689 Callières proposed to Louis XIV to invade New England by land and sea, and obtained the reappointment of Frontenac as governor. In 1690 he marched to the defense of Quebec, when it was besieged by William Phips. A valiant and experienced soldier, he aided Frontenac in saving New France from the Iroquois and in raising the prestige of the French flag. He was one of the first to receive the Cross of St. Louis (1694). Having succeeded Frontenac in 1698, he devoted all his skill and energy to the pacification of the indigenous nations. The treaty of Montreal (1701), agreed to by representatives of 39 nations, was the crowning result of all his efforts. This treaty is considered as Callières' chief claim to fame. That same year he sent Antoine Laumet de La Mothe, sieur de Cadillac to found Detroit. One of the most conspicuous figures in Canadian history, he left a reputation of disinterestedness, honour, and probity.

Family 
De Callière was born in Thorigny-sur-Vire, Lower Normandy.

He was the son of Jacques de Callières, governor of Cherbourg and the author of La Fortune des gens de qualité et des gentilshommes particuliers, enseignant l'art de vivre à la cour suivant les maximes de la politique et de la morale ("The Fortune of people of quality and private gentlemen, teaching the art of living at court according to the maxims of politics and morality"), and Madeleine Potier de Courey.

François de Callières, the eldest son, was elected to the French Academy in 1689 and also served with distinction in Louis XIV's diplomatic corps. In 1701, thanks to his ability to imitate the royal handwriting and to his mastery of the French language, succeeded Toussaint Rose as the secretary "who held the pen." His duties, designed to save the monarch time and fatigue, consisted of writing in a hand and style similar to those of the king letters and memoirs to dignitaries and foreign heads of state and of signing them with the royal name. Such a position of trust gave Callières great power which he frequently used to further the career of Louis-Hector in Canada.

External links 
 
 
 Catholic Encyclopedia (1913)

References

1648 births
1703 deaths
17th-century French people
18th-century French people
People from Manche
Governors of New France
Burials at the Cathedral-Basilica of Notre-Dame de Québec
Governors of Montreal
Persons of National Historic Significance (Canada)
17th-century Canadian politicians